Hellawes is a female name that may refer to:

 Hellawes (sorceress), a character in Sir Thomas Malory's Le Morte d'Arthur
 Hellawes, pseudonym of singer Natalia O'Shea (born 1976)